Dunajská Lužná is a municipality (village) in the Bratislava Region of western Slovakia in Senec District.

Dunajská Lužná lies approximately 15 km from the capital city of Bratislava towards Dunajská Streda and Komárno. It was founded on 1 January 1974 consisting of three formerly separate villages – Nové Košariská, Jánošíková and Nová Lipnica. Dunajská Lužná belongs to the vicinity of Bratislava. There is increasing building activity because of new inhabitants coming from Bratislava or other cities.

Not far from the municipality towards Senec lie two lakes - Malá Voda and Piesková Jama. They are used for fishing and bathing and in summer months they are quite crowded. Near the township runs a dam, protecting the villages and townships all the way from Bratislava to Gabčíkovo from flooding of the Danube River.

There is a large Roman Catholic community in Dunajská Lužná with the Church, devoted to "The Elevation of the Holy Cross". Besides Roman Catholics there are also Lutherans and other religions.

History 

The village crest shows St. Martin of Tours.

The municipality of Dunajská Lužná is also well known in European archaeology for its burial mound which dates from around 700 - 500 BCE. During the archaeological survey in the "Nové Košariská" part of the municipality, a necropolis with fire-type burials and a central earth-grave was studied. Archaeogolists found richly decorated ceramic bins here, although only few metallic objects were retrieved.

In January 2004, a permanent exposition with the name "History and present of the municipality" was opened in Dunajská Lužná and it provides visitors with closer view of the past and present life of the Township.

Demographics
Due to its proximity near Austria and Hungary the village boasts a strong ethnic mix, with up to fourteen different nationalities calling the village home.

One of these is Dunajská Lužná's strong Roma population, which is renowned for their skills as blacksmiths, and much of the ironwork seen in and around Bratislava is the craft of these smiths.

According to the 2011 census, the municipality had 4,482 inhabitants. 4,023 of inhabitants were Slovaks, 214 Hungarians, 45 Czechs, 22 Germans and 178 others and unspecified.

According to the 2021 census, the municipality had 7,622 inhabitants. 86.34% of inhabitants were Slovaks, and 3.23% were Hungarians.

See also
 List of municipalities and towns in Slovakia

References

Genealogical resources

The records for genealogical research are available at the state archive "Statny Archiv in Bratislava, Slovakia"

External links 

 Webpage of Dunajská Lužná
Surnames of living people in Dunajska Luzna

Villages and municipalities in Senec District